Đorđe Bašić (1946–19 November 2007) was a politician in Serbia. He was a member of the National Assembly of Serbia and the Assembly of Vojvodina, and he held prominent office at the city level in Novi Sad. Bašić was at different times in his career a member of the Democratic Party (Demokratska stranka, DS) and the Strength of Serbia Movement (Pokret Snaga Srbije, PSS).

Early life and private career
Bašić was born in Novi Sad, Autonomous Province of Vojvodina, in what was then the People's Republic of Serbia in the Federal People's Republic of Yugoslavia. He received a bachelor's degree and a master's degree at the University of Novi Sad and a Ph.D. at the University of Belgrade. He worked at the Institute of Energy and Process Engineering at the University of Novi Sad, serving for a time as president of the faculty council.

Politician

Early years
Bašić became the first elected president of the executive council of Novi Sad's city assembly in 1990, being chosen for the position over several other candidates. He sought election to the National Assembly of Serbia in the 1990 parliamentary election as an independent candidate in Novi Sad's first division. The winning candidate was Petar Petrović, who ran with endorsements from the Union of Reform Forces of Yugoslavia for Vojvodina and the Association for the Yugoslav Democratic Initiative.

Democratic Party
Bašić subsequently joined the DS and was elected as chair of the party's provincial board for Vojvodina in 1993.

Bašić appeared in the lead position on the DS's electoral list for the Novi Sad division in the 1993 Serbian parliamentary election and was elected when the list won four mandates. (From 1992 to 2000, Serbia's electoral law stipulated that one-third of parliamentary mandates would be assigned to candidates from successful lists in numerical order, while the remaining two-thirds would be distributed amongst other candidates on the lists at the discretion of the sponsoring parties. Due to his list position, Bašić received an automatic mandate.) The Socialist Party of Serbia won the election, and the DS served in opposition. Bašić took his seat when the assembly met in early 1994 and was chosen as one of the assembly's vice-presidents (i.e., deputy speakers). He also chaired the committee on foreign economic relations. During his term in the assembly, he was described in a New York Times article as the highest-ranking member of the Serbian opposition.

In August 1994, Bašić said that a proposal from the Republika Srpska assembly for the unification of their territory and that of the Republika Srpska Krajina with the Federal Republic of Yugoslavia deserved serious consideration. He indicated that the United Nations would first need to verify the status of the Republika Srpska and thereby provide international guarantees that the entity could unite with whomever they so chose. 

In 1996, the DS joined with the Serbian Renewal Movement (Srpski pokret obnove, SPO) and other parties to form the Zajedno (English: Together) coalition. Bašić was elected to the Vojvodina assembly in the 1996 provincial election as a Zajendo candidate, winning in Novi Sad's fifteenth division.

Bašić was expelled from the DS on 19 August 1997 against the backdrop of divisions in the party. He was not a candidate for re-election to the national assembly in 1997 and was not re-elected to the provincial assembly in 2000.

Strength of Serbia Movement
Bašić returned in political life in 2004 as a member of Bogoljub Karić's Strength of Serbia Movement. He appeared in the lead position on the party's electoral list for the 2004 provincial election and received a mandate for the Vojvodina assembly after the list won four seats. He was also the PSS's candidate for mayor of Novi Sad in the concurrent 2004 Serbian local elections, finishing fourth against Serbian Radical Party candidate Maja Gojković. When the provincial assembly met, Bašić was chosen as one of its vice-presidents. He also served on the committee on administrative and mandate-immunity issues, the committee on economy, and the committee on education, science, culture, youth, and sports.

He appeared in the sixth position on the PSS's list in the 2007 Serbian parliamentary election. The list did not cross the electoral threshold to win representation in the assembly.

Death
Bašic died on 19 November 2007 following a short illness.

Electoral record

City of Novi Sad

National Assembly of Serbia

References

1946 births
2007 deaths
Politicians from Novi Sad
Members of the National Assembly (Serbia)
Members of the Assembly of Vojvodina
Democratic Party (Serbia) politicians
Strength of Serbia Movement politicians